Alina Ramona Militaru (born 10 April 1982) is a Romanian long jumper. Her personal best jump is 6.73 metres, achieved in August 2004 in Bucharest.

Achievements

References

EAA profile

1982 births
Living people
Romanian female triple jumpers
Athletes (track and field) at the 2004 Summer Olympics
Olympic athletes of Romania
Universiade medalists in athletics (track and field)
Universiade silver medalists for Romania
Medalists at the 2003 Summer Universiade